Avneet is a given name. Notable people with the name include:

Avneet Kaur (born 2001), Indian actress
Avneet Sidhu (born 1981), Indian sport shooter
Avneet Shergill (born 1985), Indian-American soccer player

See also
Kaur

Indian given names